NoLay, also known as Isabella or Bella Gotti, is a British rapper of Greek-Cypriot and Caribbean background.

Career
NoLay first officially landed on the UK urban scene as a member of a collective called Unorthodox. Unorthodox released "No Help or Handouts" in 2004, which grabbed the attention of major labels leading to NoLay's first solo release "Unorthodox Daughter". The track was included on Warner imprint label 679 Recordings' Run The Road compilation (2005) showcasing UK grime and featuring Dizzee Rascal, Wiley, Kano and others. The label also released a vinyl to record shops with just Plan B and Nolay on it to promote the release. Run The Road's success led 679 to release a second volume in 2006 on which Nolay features again with her track "Unorthodox Chick".

NoLay has opened for Mobb Deep and the Infamous Mobb. She has toured Europe with Australian electronic rock group The Bumblebeez and featured on their 2006 track "Fuck Disco". In 2009 NoLay guested on Mongrel's Better Than Heavy album. She also featured on Tricky's 2014 album Adrian Thaws and toured Europe with him.

In 2013, she appeared in a drama on Channel 4 called Top Boy playing the character Mandy. Mandy was the girlfriend of leading character Dris and the mother of his child.

After a dozen EP and mixtape releases over the course of a decade, NoLay released album This Woman in 2017, previewed by a video for track "Dancing With The Devil", which tackled domestic violence. Nolay also released a video in July 2017 for the track "Marching" also lifted from her March 2017 release "This Woman"

In 2021, NOW Entertainment Magazine reported that Nolay released a new song tagged Gang Shit which makes the third list of her 2021 7-track Hip-hop/Rap album titled Kalas.

Name
Explaining her name NoLay explains: “It comes from the times when I was younger. It’s like you know referring to not procrastinating and wasting time. Just get to it and also take nothing lying down. Where I come from back then and even now people say No lay lay which means no hesitation. So one day a friend of mine from Peckham said I should call myself No lay.” In 2014 NoLay changed her name to Bella Gotti but decided to change her name back to stay true to her original fanbase. She explained in interviews that her alias is an alter ego similar to Eminem's Marshall Mathers and Slim Shady or Jay Z's Jigga and Jay Hova.

Car accident
On 24 April 2016, NoLay was involved in a car accident abroad which left her in a critical condition. Supporters created the Twitter trending hashtag #PrayForNolay. NoLay has since recovered.

Style
NoLay is known for her gritty rhymes and wordplay that have often gained her comparisons to MC Ghetts who she has collaborated with but to whom she doesn't believe herself to be similar: "I used to be described as 'the female version of Ghetts'; how do you know Ghetts isn’t the male version of me?"

Discography
Singles

Mixtapes and albums

EPs

Guest appearances

References

External links
Bet interview, 2017
Vice interview, 2017
Fader interview, 2017

Grime music artists
People from Croydon
Rappers from London
English women rappers
Black British women rappers
Year of birth missing (living people)
Living people